The antpeckers are a genus Parmoptila of small seed-eating birds in the family Estrildidae. They range across the tropical forests of western and central Africa.

Taxonomy
The genus Parmoptila was introduced in 1859 by the American ornithologist John Cassin to accommodate Woodhouse's antpecker. The genus name combines the Ancient Greek parmē, the word for a small round shield, and ptilon meaning "feather".

Species
The genus contains three species:

References